Emmett Cottage is a historic cottage in Brookline, Massachusetts, directly behind Saint Aidan's Church and Rectory. Of uncertain construction date but stylistically dated to the 1840s, it is a little-altered example of a small Gothic Revival cottage. It was listed on the National Register of Historic Places on October 17, 1985.

Description and history
Emmett Cottage is set well back from the north side of Freeman Street, accessed via a drive shared with 219 Freeman Street and immediately west of Saint Aidan's Church.  It is a -story wood frame Gothic Revival structure, with bargeboard decoration in the gables.

The exact location and construction date of this building is not known, since it does not appear on any early maps; its Gothic Revival styling suggests a construction date in the 1840s. It bears some resemblance to extant Gothic Revival gatehouses (more extensively altered than this one) that survive in the area. The lot stood vacant until 1871, when it was reported that an "unfinished house" (possibly just the foundation for this structure) was located here. The lot was originally part of a larger country estate, which was subdivided and first sold in 1855, and was then sold to John Mahoney in 1870. Its name is traditional, but the reason for its name is unknown.

See also
National Register of Historic Places listings in Brookline, Massachusetts

References

Houses in Brookline, Massachusetts
National Register of Historic Places in Brookline, Massachusetts
Houses on the National Register of Historic Places in Norfolk County, Massachusetts
Gothic Revival architecture in Massachusetts